Muppet Treasure Island is a CD-ROM game for the Windows PC, produced in 1996 by Activision in association with Jim Henson Interactive to tie in with the release of Muppet Treasure Island.

Gameplay 
In the game, the player is Hawkins, who leaves the Admiral Benbow Inn to sail to Treasure Island. Gonzo and Rizzo accompany the player—and so does Stevenson the Parrot, a new Muppet character who provides hints throughout the game. The Muppet characters are video clips overlaid on an animated background.

Development 
A video game based on the film was released for Windows and Mac OS in 1996 by Activision. It was developed on a budget in excess of $3 million.

The Muppet voice actors include Frank Oz, Steve Whitmire, Dave Goelz, Jerry Nelson, Kevin Clash, Bill Barretta, Bruce Lanoil, Louise Gold and Mark Mansfield.  Tim Curry and Billy Connolly are Long John Silver and Billy Bones respectively.

A DVD-ROM version was announced at COMDEX 1996, and would be eventually bundled with some OEM DVD-ROM kits.

The lead writer was Larry Kay, with dialogue by Craig Shemin, Ray De Laurentis, and Mark Loparco.

Music was composed by Nathan Wang.

Reception 
PC Zone gave the game 80 out 100 in a review.

Entertainment Weekly gave the game an A.

References

External links 

1996 video games
Activision games
Adventure games
Classic Mac OS games
First-person adventure games
Point-and-click adventure games
Single-player video games
The Muppets video games
Video games about amphibians
Video games about mice and rats
Video games about pirates
Video games based on films
Video games based on Treasure Island
Video games developed in the United States
Windows games